Vineyard is an unincorporated community located in Jessamine County, Kentucky, United States. It is an elevation of 906 ft (276m).

References

Unincorporated communities in Jessamine County, Kentucky
Unincorporated communities in Kentucky